Environmentalism or environmental rights is a broad philosophy, ideology, and social movement regarding concerns for environmental protection and improvement of the health of the environment, particularly as the measure for this health seeks to incorporate the impact of changes to the environment on humans, animals, plants and non-living matter. While environmentalism focuses more on the environmental and nature-related aspects of green ideology and politics, ecologism combines the ideology of social ecology and environmentalism. Ecologism is more commonly used in continental European languages, while environmentalism is more commonly used in English but the words have slightly different connotations.

Environmentalism advocates the preservation, restoration and improvement of the natural environment and critical earth system elements or processes such as the climate, and may be referred to as a movement to control pollution or protect plant and animal diversity. For this reason, concepts such as a land ethic, environmental ethics, biodiversity, ecology, and the biophilia hypothesis figure predominantly.

At its crux, environmentalism is an attempt to balance relations between humans and the various natural systems on which they depend in such a way that all the components are accorded a proper degree of sustainability. The exact measures and outcomes of this balance is controversial and there are many different ways for environmental concerns to be expressed in practice. Environmentalism and environmental concerns are often represented by the colour green, but this association has been appropriated by the marketing industries for the tactic known as greenwashing.

Environmentalism is opposed by anti-environmentalism, which says that the Earth is less fragile than some environmentalists maintain, and portrays environmentalism as overreacting to the human contribution to climate change or opposing human advancement.

Definitions
Environmentalism denotes a social movement that seeks to influence the political process by lobbying, activism, and education in order to protect natural resources and ecosystems.

An environmentalist is a person who may speak out about our natural environment and the sustainable management of its resources through changes in public policy or individual behaviour. This may include supporting practices such as informed consumption, conservation initiatives, investment in renewable resources, improved efficiencies in the materials economy, transitioning to new accounting paradigms such as ecological economics, renewing and revitalizing our connections with non-human life or even opting to have one less child to reduce consumption and pressure on resources.

In various ways (for example, grassroots activism and protests), environmentalists and environmental organisations seek to give the natural world a stronger voice in human affairs.

In general terms, environmentalists advocate the sustainable management of resources, and the protection (and restoration, when necessary) of the natural environment through changes in public policy and individual behaviour. In its recognition of humanity as a participant in ecosystems, the movement is centered around ecology, health, and human rights.

History

A concern for environmental protection has recurred in diverse forms, in different parts of the world, throughout history.
The earliest ideas of environmental protectionism can be found in Jainism, a religion from ancient India revived by Mahavira in the 6th century BC. Jainism offers a view that is in many ways compatible with core values associated with environmental activism, such as the protection of life by nonviolence, which could form a strong ecological ethos for global protection of the environment. Mahavira's teachings on the symbiosis between all living beings—as well as the five elements of earth, water, air, fire, and space—are core to environmental thought today.

In the Middle East, the Caliph Abu Bakr in the 630s AD commanded his army to "Bring no harm to the trees, nor burn them with fire," and to "Slay not any of the enemy's flock, save for your food." Various Arabic medical treatises during the 9th to 13th centuries dealt with environmentalism and environmental science, including the issue of pollution. The authors of such treatises included Al-Kindi, Qusta ibn Luqa, Al-Razi, Ibn Al-Jazzar, al-Tamimi, al-Masihi, Avicenna, Ali ibn Ridwan, Ibn Jumay, Isaac Israeli ben Solomon, Abd-el-latif, Ibn al-Quff, and Ibn al-Nafis. Their works covered a number of subjects related to pollution, such as air pollution, water pollution, soil contamination, and the mishandling of municipal solid waste. They also included asessments of certain localities' environmental impact.

In Europe, King Edward I of England banned the burning and sale of "sea-coal" in 1272 by proclamation in London, after its smoke had become a prevalent annoyance throughout the city. This fuel, common in London due to the local scarcity of wood, was given this early name because it could be found washed up on some shores, from where it was carted away on a wheelbarrow.

Early environmental legislation

The origins of the environmental movement lay in the response to increasing levels of smoke pollution in the atmosphere during the Industrial Revolution. The emergence of great factories and the concomitant immense growth in coal consumption gave rise to an unprecedented level of air pollution in industrial centers; after 1900 the large volume of industrial chemical discharges added to the growing load of untreated human waste. The first large-scale, modern environmental laws came in the form of Britain's Alkali Acts, passed in 1863, to regulate the deleterious air pollution (gaseous hydrochloric acid) given off by the Leblanc process, used to produce soda ash. An Alkali inspector and four sub-inspectors were appointed to curb this pollution. The inspectorate's responsibilities were gradually expanded, culminating in the Alkali Order 1958 which placed all major heavy industries that emitted smoke, grit, dust and fumes under supervision.

In industrial cities, local experts and reformers, especially after 1890, took the lead in identifying environmental degradation and pollution, and initiating grass-roots movements to demand and achieve reforms. Typically the highest priority went to water and air pollution. The Coal Smoke Abatement Society was formed in 1898 making it one of the oldest environmental NGOs. It was founded by artist Sir William Blake Richmond, frustrated with the pall cast by coal smoke. Although there were earlier pieces of legislation, the Public Health Act 1875 required all furnaces and fireplaces to consume their own smoke. It also provided for sanctions against factories that emitted large amounts of black smoke. This law's provisions were extended in 1926 with the Smoke Abatement Act to include other emissions, such as soot, ash, and gritty particles, and to empower local authorities to impose their own regulations.

During the Spanish Revolution, anarchist-controlled territories undertook several environmental reforms, which were possibly the largest in the world at the time. Daniel Guerin notes that anarchist territories would diversify crops, extend irrigation, initiate reforestation, start tree nurseries and help to establish naturist communities. Once there was a link discovered between air pollution and tuberculosis, the CNT shut down several metal factories.

It was only under the impetus of the Great Smog of 1952 in London, which almost brought the city to a standstill and may have caused upward of 6,000 deaths, that the Clean Air Act 1956 was passed and airborne pollution in the city was first tackled. Financial incentives were offered to householders to replace open coal fires with alternatives (such as installing gas fires) or those who preferred, to burn coke instead (a byproduct of town gas production) which produces minimal smoke. 'Smoke control areas' were introduced in some towns and cities where only smokeless fuels could be burnt and power stations were relocated away from cities. The act formed an important impetus to modern environmentalism and caused a rethinking of the dangers of environmental degradation to people's quality of life.

The late 19th century also saw the passage of the first wildlife conservation laws.
The zoologist Alfred Newton published a series of investigations into the Desirability of establishing a 'Close-time' for the preservation of indigenous animals between 1872 and 1903. His advocacy for legislation to protect animals from hunting during the mating season led to the formation of the Royal Society for the Protection of Birds and influenced the passage of the Sea Birds Preservation Act in 1869 as the first nature protection law in the world.

First environmental movements
Early interest in the environment was a feature of the Romantic movement in the early 19th century. One of the earliest modern pronouncements on thinking about human industrial advancement and its influence on the environment was written by Japanese geographer, educator, philosopher and author Tsunesaburo Makiguchi in his 1903 publication Jinsei Chirigaku (A Geography of Human Life). In Britain the poet William Wordsworth travelled extensively in the Lake District and wrote that it is a "sort of national property in which every man has a right and interest who has an eye to perceive and a heart to enjoy".

Systematic efforts on behalf of the environment only began in the late 19th century; it grew out of the amenity movement in Britain in the 1870s, which was a reaction to industrialisation, the growth of cities, and worsening air and water pollution. Starting with the formation of the Commons Preservation Society in 1865, the movement championed rural preservation against the encroachments of industrialisation. Robert Hunter, solicitor for the society, worked with Hardwicke Rawnsley, Octavia Hill, and John Ruskin to lead a successful campaign to prevent the construction of railways to carry slate from the quarries, which would have ruined the unspoiled valleys of Newlands and Ennerdale. This success led to the formation of the Lake District Defence Society (later to become The Friends of the Lake District).

Peter Kropotkin wrote about ecology in economics, agricultural science, conservation, ethology, criminology, urban planning, geography, geology and biology. He observed in Swiss and Siberian glaciers that they had been slowly melting since the dawn of the industrial revolution, possibly making him one of the first predictors for climate change. He also observed the damage done from deforestation and hunting. Kropotkin's writings would become influential in the 1970s and became a major inspiration for the intentional community movement as well as his ideas becoming the basis for the theory of social ecology.

In 1893 Hill, Hunter and Rawnsley agreed to set up a national body to coordinate environmental conservation efforts across the country; the "National Trust for Places of Historic Interest or Natural Beauty" was formally inaugurated in 1894. The organisation obtained secure footing through the 1907 National Trust Bill, which gave the trust the status of a statutory corporation. and the bill was passed in August 1907.

An early "Back-to-Nature" movement, which anticipated the romantic ideal of modern environmentalism, was advocated by intellectuals such as John Ruskin, William Morris, George Bernard Shaw and Edward Carpenter, who were all against consumerism, pollution and other activities that were harmful to the natural world. The movement was a reaction to the urban conditions of the industrial towns, where sanitation was awful, pollution levels intolerable and housing terribly cramped. Idealists championed the rural life as a mythical utopia and advocated a return to it. John Ruskin argued that people should return to a "small piece of English ground, beautiful, peaceful, and fruitful. We will have no steam engines upon it ... we will have plenty of flowers and vegetables ... we will have some music and poetry; the children will learn to dance to it and sing it."

Practical ventures in the establishment of small cooperative farms were even attempted and old rural traditions, without the "taint of manufacture or the canker of artificiality", were enthusiastically revived, including the Morris dance and the maypole.

These ideas also inspired various environmental groups in the UK, such as the Royal Society for the Protection of Birds, established in 1889 by Emily Williamson as a protest group to campaign for greater protection for the indigenous birds of the island. The Society attracted growing support from the suburban middle-classes as well as support from many other influential figures, such as the ornithologist Professor Alfred Newton. By 1900, public support for the organisation had grown, and it had over 25,000 members. The garden city movement incorporated many environmental concerns into its urban planning manifesto; the Socialist League and The Clarion movement also began to advocate measures of nature conservation.

The movement in the United States began in the late 19th century, out of concerns for protecting the natural resources of the West, with individuals such as John Muir and Henry David Thoreau making key philosophical contributions. Thoreau was interested in peoples' relationship with nature and studied this by living close to nature in a simple life. He published his experiences in the book Walden, which argues that people should become intimately close with nature. Muir came to believe in nature's inherent right, especially after spending time hiking in Yosemite Valley and studying both the ecology and geology. He successfully lobbied congress to form Yosemite National Park and went on to set up the Sierra Club in 1892. The conservationist principles as well as the belief in an inherent right of nature were to become the bedrock of modern environmentalism.

In the 20th century, environmental ideas continued to grow in popularity and recognition. Efforts were starting to be made to save some wildlife, particularly the American bison. The death of the last passenger pigeon as well as the endangerment of the American bison helped to focus the minds of conservationists and to popularise their concerns. In 1916, the National Park Service was founded by US President Woodrow Wilson.

The Forestry Commission was set up in 1919 in Britain to increase the amount of woodland in Britain by buying land for afforestation and reforestation. The commission was also tasked with promoting forestry and the production of timber for trade. During the 1920s the Commission focused on acquiring land to begin planting out new forests; much of the land was previously used for agricultural purposes. By 1939 the Forestry Commission was the largest landowner in Britain.

During the 1930s the Nazis had elements that were supportive of animal rights, zoos and wildlife, and took several measures to ensure their protection. In 1933 the government created a stringent animal-protection law and in 1934,  (The Reich Hunting Law) was enacted which limited hunting. Several Nazis were environmentalists (notably Rudolf Hess), and species protection and animal welfare were significant issues in the regime. In 1935, the regime enacted the "Reich Nature Protection Act".

In 1949, A Sand County Almanac by Aldo Leopold was published. It explained Leopold's belief that humankind should have moral respect for the environment and that it is unethical to harm it. The book is sometimes called the most influential book on conservation.

Throughout the 1950s, 1960s, 1970s and beyond, photography was used to enhance public awareness of the need for protecting land and recruiting members to environmental organisations. David Brower, Ansel Adams and Nancy Newhall created the Sierra Club Exhibit Format Series, which helped raise public environmental awareness and brought a rapidly increasing flood of new members to the Sierra Club and to the environmental movement in general. This Is Dinosaur, edited by Wallace Stegner with photographs by Martin Litton and Philip Hyde, prevented the building of dams within Dinosaur National Monument by becoming part of a new kind of activism called environmentalism that combined the conservationist ideals of Thoreau, Leopold and Muir with hard-hitting advertising, lobbying, book distribution, letter writing campaigns, and more. The powerful use of photography in addition to the written word for conservation dated back to the creation of Yosemite National Park, when photographs persuaded Abraham Lincoln to preserve the beautiful glacier carved landscape for all time. The Sierra Club Exhibit Format Series galvanised public opposition to building dams in the Grand Canyon and protected many other national treasures. The Sierra Club often led a coalition of many environmental groups including the Wilderness Society and many others.

After a focus on preserving wilderness in the 1950s and 1960s, the Sierra Club and other groups broadened their focus to include such issues as air and water pollution, population concern, and curbing the exploitation of natural resources.

Post-war expansion

In 1962, Silent Spring by American biologist Rachel Carson was published. The book cataloged the environmental impacts of the indiscriminate spraying of DDT in the US and questioned the logic of releasing large amounts of chemicals into the environment without fully understanding their effects on human health and ecology. The book suggested that DDT and other pesticides may cause cancer and that their agricultural use was a threat to wildlife, particularly birds. The resulting public concern led to the creation of the United States Environmental Protection Agency in 1970 which subsequently banned the agricultural use of DDT in the US in 1972. The limited use of DDT in disease vector control continues to this day in certain parts of the world and remains controversial. The book's legacy was to produce a far greater awareness of environmental issues and interest into how people affect the environment. With this new interest in environment came interest in problems such as air pollution and petroleum spills, and environmental interest grew. New pressure groups formed, notably Greenpeace and Friends of the Earth (US), as well as notable local organisations such as the Wyoming Outdoor Council, which was founded in 1967.

In the 1970s, the environmental movement gained rapid speed around the world as a productive outgrowth of the counterculture movement.

The world's first political parties to campaign on a predominantly environmental platform were the United Tasmania Group of Tasmania, Australia, and the Values Party of New Zealand. The first green party in Europe was the Popular Movement for the Environment, founded in 1972 in the Swiss canton of Neuchâtel. The first national green party in Europe was PEOPLE, founded in Britain in February 1973, which eventually turned into the Ecology Party, and then the Green Party.

Protection of the environment also became important in the developing world; the Chipko movement was formed in India under the influence of Mhatmas Gandhi and they set up peaceful resistance to deforestation by literally hugging trees (leading to the term "tree huggers"). Their peaceful methods of protest and slogan "ecology is permanent economy" were very influential.

Another milestone in the movement was the creation of Earth Day. Earth Day was first observed in San Francisco and other cities on 21 March 1970, the first day of spring. It was created to give awareness to environmental issues. On 21 March 1971, United Nations Secretary-General U Thant spoke of a spaceship Earth on Earth Day, hereby referring to the ecosystem services the earth supplies to us, and hence our obligation to protect it (and with it, ourselves). Earth Day is now coordinated globally by the Earth Day Network, and is celebrated in more than 192 countries every year.

The UN's first major conference on international environmental issues, the United Nations Conference on the Human Environment (also known as the Stockholm Conference), was held on 5–16 June 1972. It marked a turning point in the development of international environmental politics.

By the mid-1970s, many felt that people were on the edge of environmental catastrophe. The back-to-the-land movement started to form and ideas of environmental ethics joined with anti-Vietnam War sentiments and other political issues. These individuals lived outside normal society and started to take on some of the more radical environmental theories such as deep ecology. Around this time more mainstream environmentalism was starting to show force with the signing of the Endangered Species Act in 1973 and the formation of CITES in 1975. Significant amendments were also enacted to the United States Clean Air Act and Clean Water Act.

In 1979, James Lovelock, a British scientist, published Gaia: A new look at life on Earth, which put forth the Gaia hypothesis; it proposes that life on earth can be understood as a single organism. This became an important part of the Deep Green ideology. Throughout the rest of the history of environmentalism there has been debate and argument between more radical followers of this Deep Green ideology and more mainstream environmentalists.

21st century and beyond
Environmentalism continues to evolve to face up to new issues such as global warming, overpopulation, genetic engineering, and plastic pollution.

Research demonstrates a precipitous decline in the US public's interest in 19 different areas of environmental concern. Americans are less likely to be actively participating in an environmental movement or organisation and more likely to identify as "unsympathetic" to an environmental movement than in 2000. This is likely a lingering factor of the Great Recession in 2008. Since 2005, the percentage of Americans agreeing that the environment should be given priority over economic growth has dropped 10 points; in contrast, those feeling that growth should be given priority "even if the environment suffers to some extent" has risen 12 percent. Nevertheless, a recent National Geographic survey indicated strong desire for commitment across a dozen countries, indicating a majority were in favour of more than half of the Earth's land surface being protected.

New forms of ecoactivism 

Tree sitting is a form of activism in which the protester sits in a tree in an attempt to stop the removal of a tree or to impede the demolition of an area with the longest and most famous tree-sitter being Julia Butterfly Hill, who spent 738 days in a California Redwood, saving a three-acre tract of forest. Also notable is the Yellow Finch tree sit, which was a 932-day blockade of the Mountain Valley Pipeline from 2018 to 2021.

Sit-ins can be used to encourage social change, such as the Greensboro sit-ins, a series of protests in 1960 to stop racial segregation, but can also be used in ecoactivism, as in the Dakota Access Pipeline Protest.

Before the Syrian Civil War, Rojava had been ecologically damaged by monoculture, oil extraction, damming of rivers, deforestation, drought, topsoil loss and general pollution. The DFNS launched a campaign titled 'Make Rojava Green Again' (a parody of Make America Great Again) which is attempting to provide renewable energy to communities (especially solar energy), reforestation, protecting water sources, planting gardens, promoting urban agriculture, creating wildlife reserves, water recycling, beekeeping, expanding public transportation and promoting environmental awareness within their communities.

The Rebel Zapatista Autonomous Municipalities are firmly environmentalist and have stopped the extraction of oil, uranium, timber and metal from the Lacandon Jungle and stopped the use of pesticides and chemical fertilisers in farming.

The CIPO-RFM has engaged in sabotage and direct action against wind farms, shrimp farms, eucalyptus plantations and the timber industry. They have also set up corn and coffee worker cooperatives and built schools and hospitals to help the local populations. They have also created a network of autonomous community radio stations to educate people about dangers to the environment and inform the surrounding communities about new industrial projects that would destroy more land. In 2001, the CIPO-RFM defeated the construction of a highway that was part of Plan Puebla Panama.

Environmental movement

The environmental movement (a term that sometimes includes the conservation and green movements) is a diverse scientific, social, and political movement. Though the movement is represented by a range of organisations, because of the inclusion of environmentalism in the classroom curriculum, the environmental movement has a younger demographic than is common in other social movements (see green seniors).

Environmentalism as a movement covers broad areas of institutional oppression, including for example: consumption of ecosystems and natural resources into waste, dumping waste into disadvantaged communities, air pollution, water pollution, weak infrastructure, exposure of organic life to toxins, mono-culture, anti-polythene drive (jhola movement) and various other focuses. Because of these divisions, the environmental movement can be categorized into these primary focuses: environmental science, environmental activism, environmental advocacy, and environmental justice.

Free market environmentalism

Free market environmentalism is a theory that argues that the free market, property rights, and tort law provide the best tools to preserve the health and sustainability of the environment. It considers environmental stewardship to be natural, as well as the expulsion of polluters and other aggressors through individual and class action.

Evangelical environmentalism

Evangelical environmentalism is an environmental movement in the United States in which some Evangelicals have emphasized biblical mandates concerning humanity's role as steward and subsequent responsibility for the care taking of Creation. While the movement has focused on different environmental issues, it is best known for its focus of addressing climate action from a biblically grounded theological perspective. This movement is controversial among some non-Christian environmentalists due to its rooting in a specific religion.

Preservation and conservation

Environmental preservation in the United States and other parts of the world, including Australia, is viewed as the setting aside of natural resources to prevent damage caused by contact with humans or by certain human activities, such as logging, mining, hunting, and fishing, often to replace them with new human activities such as tourism and recreation. Regulations and laws may be enacted for the preservation of natural resources.

Organisations and conferences

Environmental organisations can be global, regional, national or local; they can be government-run or private (NGO). Environmentalist activity exists in almost every country. Moreover, groups dedicated to community development and social justice also focus on environmental concerns.

Some US environmental organisations, among them the Natural Resources Defense Council and the Environmental Defense Fund, specialise in bringing lawsuits (a tactic seen as particularly useful in that country). Other groups, such as the US-based National Wildlife Federation, Earth Day, National Cleanup Day, the Nature Conservancy, and The Wilderness Society, and global groups like the World Wide Fund for Nature and Friends of the Earth, disseminate information, participate in public hearings, lobby, stage demonstrations, and may purchase land for preservation. Statewide nonprofit organisations such as the Wyoming Outdoor Council often collaborate with these national organisations and employ similar strategies. Smaller groups, including Wildlife Conservation International, conduct research on endangered species and ecosystems. More radical organisations, such as Greenpeace, Earth First!, and the Earth Liberation Front, have more directly opposed actions they regard as environmentally harmful. While Greenpeace is devoted to nonviolent confrontation as a means of bearing witness to environmental wrongs and bringing issues into the public realm for debate, the underground Earth Liberation Front engages in the clandestine destruction of property, the release of caged or penned animals, and other criminal acts. Such tactics are regarded as unusual within the movement, however.

On an international level, concern for the environment was the subject of a United Nations Conference on the Human Environment in Stockholm in 1972, attended by 114 nations. Out of this meeting developed the United Nations Environment Programme (UNEP) and the follow-up United Nations Conference on Environment and Development in 1992. Other international organisations in support of environmental policies development include the Commission for Environmental Cooperation (as part of NAFTA), the European Environment Agency (EEA), and the Intergovernmental Panel on Climate Change (IPCC).

Environmental protests

Notable environmental protests and campaigns include:

 2010 Xinfa aluminum plant protest
 Anti-WAAhnsinns Festival
 Car-Free Days
 Camp for Climate Action
 Campaign against Climate Change
 Climate Rush
 Cofán people oil drilling protest (Ecuador)
 Earth Day
 Earth First!
 Earthlife Africa
 Global Climate Strikes
 Global Day of Action
 Gurindji Strike
 Hands off our Forest
 Homes before Roads
 Kupa Piti Kungka Tjuta
 Love Canal protests
 March Against Monsanto
 Nevada Desert Experience
 Plane Mad
 Plane Stupid
 Qidong protest
 Save Manapouri Campaign
 Say Yes demonstrations
 Shifang protest
 Stop Climate Chaos

Environmentalists

Notable advocates for environmental protection and sustainability include:

 Edward Abbey (author)
 David Attenborough (broadcaster, naturalist)
 John James Audubon (naturalist)
 Judi Bari (environmentalist)
 Frances Beinecke (environmentalist and former president of the Natural Resources Defense Council)
 David Bellamy (botanist)
 Wendell Berry (farmer, philosopher)
 Murray Bookchin (anarchist, philosopher, social ecologist)
 Erin Brockovich (environmental lawyer and activist)
 David Brower (writer, activist)
 Lester Brown (environmental analyst, author)
 Carol Browner (lawyer and activist)
 Kevin Buzzacott (Aboriginal activist)
 Berta Caceres (environmental and indigenous rights activist)
 Helen Caldicott (medical doctor)
 Rachel Carson (biologist, writer)
 Majora Carter (urban revitalization strategist)
 Prince Charles (British Royal Family member)
 Barry Commoner (biologist, politician)
 Jacques-Yves Cousteau (explorer, ecologist)
 Herman Daly (ecological economist and steady-state theorist)
 Peter Dauvergne (political scientist)
 Laurie David (activist and producer)
 Marina DeBris (environmental artist)
 Leonardo DiCaprio (actor and environmentalist)
 Sylvia Earle (marine biologist)
 Paul R. Ehrlich (population biologist)
 Hans-Josef Fell (German Green Party member)
 Jane Fonda (actor)
 Josh Fox (filmmaker, environmental activist)
 Mizuho Fukushima (politician, activist)
 Peter Garrett (musician, politician)
 Jane Goodall (primatologist, anthropologist, and UN Messenger of Peace)
 Lois Gibbs (Founder of the Center for Health, Environment and Justice)
 Al Gore (former Vice President of the United States)
 Daryl Hannah (activist)
 James Hansen (scientist)
 Garrett Hardin (ecologist, ecophilosopher)
 Denis Hayes (environmentalist and solar power advocate)
 Julia Butterfly Hill (activist)
 Robert Hunter (journalist, co-founder and first president of Greenpeace)
 Tetsunari Iida (sustainable energy advocate)
 Lisa P. Jackson (chemical engineer and former administrator of the United States Environmental Protection Agency)
 Naomi Klein (writer, activist)
 Winona LaDuke (environmentalist)
 Aldo Leopold (ecologist)
 A. Carl Leopold (plant physiologist)
 James Lovelock (scientist)
 Amory Lovins (energy policy analyst)
 Hunter Lovins (environmentalist)
 Caroline Lucas (politician)
 Wangari Maathai (activist and Nobel laureate)
 Jarid Manos (CEO of the Great Plains Restoration Council)
 Xiuhtezcatl Martinez (environmental activist, hip-hop artist)
 Bill McKibben (writer, activist)
 David McTaggart (activist)
 Chico Mendes (activist)
 Joni Mitchell (musician, environmental activist)
 George Monbiot (journalist)
 John Muir (naturalist, activist)
 Ralph Nader (activist)
 Gaylord Nelson (politician)
 Alan Pears (environmental consultant and energy efficiency pioneer)
 Gifford Pinchot (first chief of the USFS)
 Jonathon Porritt (politician)
 John Wesley Powell (second director of the USGS)
 Barbara Pyle (documentarian and executive producer of Captain Planet and the Planeteers)
 Phil Radford (environmental, clean energy and democracy advocate, Greenpeace Executive Director)
 Bonnie Raitt (musician)
 Theodore Roosevelt (former President of the United States)
 Habiba Sarobi (politician and activist)
 E. F. Schumacher (author of Small Is Beautiful)
 Vandana Shiva (ecofeminist and activist)
 Marina Silva (politician and activist)
 Alicia Silverstone (activist and author of The Kind Diet)
 Lauren Singer (activist and entrepreneur)
 Swami Sundaranand (Yogi, photographer, and mountaineer)
 Cass Sunstein (environmental lawyer)
 David Suzuki (scientist, broadcaster)
 Henry David Thoreau (writer, philosopher)
 Greta Thunberg (environmentalist)
 Stewart Udall (former United States Secretary of the Interior)
 Jo Valentine (politician and activist)
 Dominique Voynet (politician and environmentalist)
 Christopher O. Ward (water infrastructure expert)
 Alice Waters (activist and restaurateur)
 Gabriel Willow (environmental educator, naturalist)
 Howard Zahniser (author of the 1964 Wilderness Act)

Assassinations

Every year, more than 100 environmental activists are murdered throughout the world. Most recent deaths are in Brazil, where activists combat logging in the Amazon rainforest.

116 environmental activists were assassinated in 2014, and 185 in 2015. This represents more than two environmentalists assassinated every week in 2014 and three every week in 2015. More than 200 environmental activists were assassinated worldwide between 2016 and early 2018. A 2020 incident saw several rangers murdered in the Congo Rainforest by poaching squads. Occurrences like this are relatively common, and account for a large number of deaths.

In popular culture

 The U.S. Forest Service created Smokey the Bear in 1944; he appeared in countless posters, radio and television programs, movies, press releases, and other guises to warn about forest fires.
 The comic strip Mark Trail, by environmentalist Ed Dodd, began in 1946; it still appears weekly in 175 newspapers.
 The children's animated show Captain Planet and the Planeteers, created by Ted Turner and Barbara Pyle in 1989 to inform children about environmental issues. The show aired for six seasons and 113 episodes, in 100 countries worldwide from 1990 to 1996.
 In 1974, Spokane, Washington, became the smallest city ever to host a World's Fair. From Saturday, 4 May, to Sunday, 3 November 1974, Spokane hosted Expo 74, the first world's fair to focus on the environment. The theme of Expo 74 was "Celebrating Tomorrow's Fresh New Environment".
 FernGully: The Last Rainforest is an animated motion picture released in 1992, which focuses exclusively on the environment. The movie is based on a book under the same title by Diana Young. In 1998, a sequel, FernGully 2: The Magical Rescue, was introduced.
 Miss Earth is one of the Big Four international beauty pageants. (The other three are Miss Universe, Miss International, and Miss World.) Out of these four beauty pageants, Miss Earth is the only international beauty pageant that promotes "environmental awareness". The reigning titleholders dedicate their year to promote specific projects and often address issues concerning the environment and other global issues through school tours, tree planting activities, street campaigns, coastal clean ups, speaking engagements, shopping mall tours, media guesting, environmental fair, storytelling programs, eco-fashion shows, and other environmental activities. The Miss Earth winner is the spokesperson for the Miss Earth Foundation, the United Nations Environment Programme (UNEP) and other environmental organizations. The Miss Earth Foundation also works with the environmental departments and ministries of participating countries, various private sectors and corporations, as well as Greenpeace and the World Wildlife Foundation (WWF).
 Another area of environmentalism is to use art to raise awareness about misuse of the environment. One example is trashion, using trash to create clothes, jewelry, and other objects for the home. Marina DeBris is one trashion artist, who focuses on ocean and beach trash to design clothes and for fund raising, education.

Criticism and alternative views

When environmentalism first became popular during the early 20th century, the focus was wilderness protection and wildlife preservation. These goals reflected the interests of the movement's initial, primarily white middle and upper class supporters, including through viewing preservation and protection via a lens that failed to appreciate the centuries-long work of indigenous communities who had lived without ushering in the types of environmental devastation these settler colonial "environmentalists" now sought to mitigate. The actions of many mainstream environmental organizations still reflect these early principles. Numerous low-income minorities felt isolated or negatively impacted by the movement, exemplified by the Southwest Organizing Project's (SWOP) Letter to the Group of 10, a letter sent to major environmental organizations by several local environmental justice activists. The letter argued that the environmental movement was so concerned about cleaning up and preserving nature that it ignored the negative side-effects that doing so caused communities nearby, namely less job growth. In addition, the NIMBY movement has transferred locally unwanted land uses (LULUs) from middle-class neighborhoods to poor communities with large minority populations. Therefore, vulnerable communities with fewer political opportunities are more often exposed to hazardous waste and toxins. This has resulted in the PIBBY principle, or at least the PIMBY (Place-in-minorities'-backyard), as supported by the United Church of Christ's study in 1987.

As a result, some minorities have viewed the environmental movement as elitist. Environmental elitism manifested itself in three different forms:

 Compositional – Environmentalists are from the middle and upper class.
 Ideological – The reforms benefit the movement's supporters but impose costs on nonparticipants.
 Impact – The reforms have "regressive social impacts". They disproportionately benefit environmentalists and harm underrepresented populations.

Many environmentalists believe that human interference with 'nature' should be restricted or minimised as a matter of urgency (for the sake of life, or the planet, or just for the benefit of the human species), whereas environmental skeptics and anti-environmentalists do not believe that there is such a need. One can also regard oneself as an environmentalist and believe that human 'interference' with 'nature' should be increased. Nevertheless, there is a risk that the shift from emotional environmentalism into the technical management of natural resources and hazards could decrease the touch of humans with nature, leading to less concern with environment preservation. Increasingly, typical conservation rhetoric is being replaced with restoration approaches and larger landscape initiatives that seek to create more holistic impacts.

In the 2000s, American author, film director, medical graduate and intellect Michael Crichton criticized environmentalism as being religiously motivated rather than grounded in empirical evidence, arguing that climate change was a natural part of Earth's history and had been occurring long before humans dominated the planet. Also claiming to argue from his minor education in anthropology, he stated that religion was a part of human social make-up and that if it was suppressed, it would simply re-emerge in another form. With the decline of Christianity and Church attendance in the Western world, environmentalism has become more popular according to him, which he termed as "the religion of urban atheists".

Others seek a balance that involves both caring deeply for the environment while letting science guide human actions affecting it. Such an approach would avoid the emotionalism which, for example, anti-GMO activism has been criticized for, and protect the integrity of science. Planting trees, for another example, can be emotionally satisfying but should also involve being conscious of ecological concerns such as the effect on water cycles and the use of nonnative, potentially invasive species.

See also

 Outline of environmentalism
 Anti-environmentalism
 Climate movement
 Conservation movement
 Ecomodernism
 Human ecology
 Human impact on the environment
 Nature conservation
 Radical environmentalism
 Religion and environmentalism
 Sustainability
 List of climate scientists
 List of women climate scientists and activists

References

Further reading

 Borowy, Iris. "Before UNEP: who was in charge of the global environment? The struggle for institutional responsibility 1968–72." Journal of Global History 14.1 (2019): 87-106.
 Daynes, Byron W., and Glen Sussman, eds. White House Politics and the Environment: Franklin D. Roosevelt to George W. Bush (Texas A&M University Press; 2010) 300 pages; evaluates how 12 presidents helped or hindered the cause of environmental protection.
 Johnson, Erik W., and Scott Frickel, (2011). "Ecological Threat and the Founding of U.S. National Environmental Movement Organizations, 1962–1998," Social Problems 58 (Aug. 2011), 305–29.
 
 
 John McCormick. 1995. The Global Environmental Movement. John Wiley. London. 312 pp.  
 de Steiguer, J. Edward. 2006.  The Origins of Modern Environmental Thought. University of Arizona Press. Tucson. 246 pp. 
 Tooze, Adam, "Democracy and Its Discontents", The New York Review of Books, vol. LXVI, no. 10 (6 June 2019), pp. 52–53, 56–57.  "Democracy has no clear answer for the mindless operation of bureaucratic and technological power.  We may indeed be witnessing its extension in the form of artificial intelligence and robotics.  Likewise, after decades of dire warning, the environmental problem remains fundamentally unaddressed.... Bureaucratic overreach and environmental catastrophe are precisely the kinds of slow-moving existential challenges that democracies deal with very badly.... Finally, there is the threat du jour:  corporations and the technologies they promote."  (pp. 56–57.)
 Verweij, Marco; Thompson, Michael (eds), 2006, Clumsy Solutions for a Complex World: Governance, Politics and Plural Perceptions, Basingstoke: Palgrave Macmillan, 
 Vogel, David. California Greenin': How the Golden State Became an Environmental Leader (2018) 280 pp  online review
 Woodhouse, Keith M. "The Politics of Ecology: Environmentalism and Liberalism in the 1960s," Journal for the Study of Radicalism, Volume 2, Number 2, 2009, pp. 53–84
 World Bank, 2003, "Sustainable Development in a Dynamic World: Transforming Institutions, Growth, and Quality of Life", World Development Report 2003, International Bank for Reconstruction and Development and Oxford University Press.

External links

 
 Westland – A Canadian television series (1984–2007) on a broad range of environmental issues, from the UBC Library Digital Collections
 The Directory of Environmental Websites

 
Green politics
Habitat
Environmental social science concepts
1920s neologisms